Electoral district of Glenhuntly was an electoral district of the Legislative Assembly in the Australian state of Victoria.

Members for Glenhuntly

Election results

Glenhuntly
1967 establishments in Australia
1985 disestablishments in Australia